Rudolf Gavenčiak (born 7 February 1965) is a Slovak boxer. He competed in the men's heavyweight event at the 1988 Summer Olympics.

References

1965 births
Living people
Slovak male boxers
Czechoslovak male boxers
Olympic boxers of Czechoslovakia
Boxers at the 1988 Summer Olympics
People from Čadca District
Sportspeople from the Žilina Region
Heavyweight boxers